Sheesh may refer to:

"Sheesh", a song by Benee from her 2020 album Hey U X
"Sheesh!", a 2021 song by Surfaces